Villa Mira Monte is a historic villa in Morgan Hill, California, United States, which is listed on the National Register of Historic Places. It was built for Hiram Morgan Hill, founder of Morgan Hill, and his wife Diana Murphy Hill, a Californio heiress.

History
The Hiram Morgan Hill house was built in 1886 for Morgan Hill and his wife, Diana. The site also includes the Morgan Hill Museum is in a farmhouse built in 1911 by John Acton.

Hill was from Missouri; his wife Diana was an heiress. The house was built on land inherited by Diana from her father, Daniel Murphy. Her Irish-born grandfather had emigrated to Canada penniless and acquired land grants in California.

With the Hill couple separated, Hiram became a cattle rancher in Nevada, and Diana became a socialite in Washington, D.C. Their daughter, also named Diana, married Baron Hardouin Reinhach-Werth in 1911 and died by suicide in 1912. The father died in 1913. The mother emigrated to England and married Sir George Rhodes. She became known as Lady Diana Helen Murphy Hill Rhodes, and she died in Cannes in 1937. She was buried in the Santa Clara Cemetery with the rest of her family.

Architecture
The house was designed in the Stick-Eastlake architectural style. It has been listed on the National Register of Historic Places since May 25, 1978.

References

External links

Houses on the National Register of Historic Places in California
National Register of Historic Places in Santa Clara County, California
Stick-Eastlake architecture in California
Houses completed in 1886
Morgan Hill, California
1886 establishments in California